Dumitru Stratilescu, sometimes spelled as Dumitru Strătilescu, (28 August 1864 – 1927) was a Romanian general and military commander. During the First World War, he commanded the First, Third, Fourth and Fifth corps of the First Army of Romania.

Military career
Dumitru Stratilescu was born on 28 August 1864. He began his military education in 1884 by attending the Military School for Infantry and Cavalry in Bucharest, which he graduated from in 1886. He reached the rank of lieutenant in 1890, was promoted to the rank of captain in 1895, and was promoted to the rank of major in 1905. He also attended the War School in Bucharest. In 1908, he was promoted to the rank of lieutenant colonel, while he reached the rank of colonel in 1911. Stratilescu then participated in the Second Balkan War.

World War I
At the time of Romania's entry into the war on the side of the Entente powers, Stratilescu was acting Deputy Chief of the General Staff. From 1 November 1916, he served as commander of the First Corps, replacing Nicolae Petalu. He was in office for less than fifteen days, however, as he was appointed commander of the First Army on 12 November. Commanding the First Army, he took part in the Battle of Bucharest. He also commanded the First Army for a very short time because it was disbanded by a reorganization carried out in December 1916. In 1916, he was promoted to the rank of brigadier general. He then took command of the First Division, which he commanded during the Battle of Mărăști. He was decorated with the Order of Michael the Brave, Third Class, for the way he led the First Infantry Division in Mărăști.

In December 1917 he became commander of the Fourth Corps, which he commanded until February 1918, when he was appointed commander of the Fifth Corps. After that, from May 1918 until the end of the war, he commanded Third Corps. During 1918, he reached the rank of divisional general.

Postwar life
After the end of the war, he served as commander of the 1st inspection area. He then served as Chief Inspector of the Army. He died in 1927 in Bucharest.

Awards
 Order of the Star of Romania, officer (1912)
 Order of the Crown, commander (1909)
 Medal for Manhood and Faith, with the distinction "Campaign of 1913" (1913)
 Order of Michael the Brave, III Class (July 21, 1917)

References

Bibliography
 Kiritescu, Constantin, History of the war for the unification of Romania, Scientific and Encyclopedic Publishing House, Bucharest, 1989
 Ioanițiu Alexandru (Lt.-Colonel), Războiul României: 1916-1918, vol 1, Tipografia Geniului, București, 1929
 Romania in the World War 1916-1919, Documents, Annexes , Volume 1, Official Gazette and State Printing, Bucharest, 1934
 The General Headquarters of the Romanian Army. Documents 1916 - 1920 , Machiavelli Publishing House, Bucharest, 1996
 Military history of the Romanian people, vol. V, Military Publishing House, Bucharest, 1989
 Romania in the years of the First World War, Military Publishing House, Bucharest, 1987
 Romania in the First World War'', Military Publishing House, 1979

1864 births
1927 deaths
Romanian Land Forces generals
Romanian Army World War I generals
Romanian military personnel of the Second Balkan War